José Henrique Souto Esteves (born 31 March 1980 in Braga), known as Henrique, is a Portuguese former footballer who played as a centre forward.

References

External links

1980 births
Living people
Sportspeople from Braga
Portuguese footballers
Association football forwards
Primeira Liga players
Liga Portugal 2 players
Segunda Divisão players
S.C. Braga B players
S.C. Braga players
S.C. Espinho players
C.F. Estrela da Amadora players
Leixões S.C. players
Vitória S.C. players
C.D. Santa Clara players
Portimonense S.C. players
Vilaverdense F.C. players
Cypriot First Division players
Doxa Katokopias FC players
AEL Limassol players
Olympiakos Nicosia players
Ermis Aradippou FC players
Nea Salamis Famagusta FC players
Portuguese expatriate footballers
Expatriate footballers in Cyprus
Portuguese expatriate sportspeople in Cyprus